Honjō or Honjo may refer to:

Places
 Honjō, Akita
 Honjō, Nagano
 Honjō, Ōita
 Honjō, Saitama
 Honjo, Tokyo
 Honjo Stadium
 Honjo, Yutaro

People
 , Japanese samurai
 , Japanese general
, Japanese immunologist

Fictional characters
 Honjō Kamatari from Rurouni Kenshin
 Mika Honjō from Ginban Kaleidoscope
 Ren Honjo from Nana